Claymont is a neighborhood in southwestern Lexington, Kentucky, United States. Its boundaries are Hill N Dale Road to the north, Clays Mill Road to the west, Pasadena Drive to the south, and Southview Drive to the east.

Neighborhood statistics

 Area: 
 Population: 100
 Population density: 2,225 people per square mile
 Median household income (2010): $45,374

References

Neighborhoods in Lexington, Kentucky